The Balgowlah Boys Campus of Northern Beaches Secondary College is a government-funded single-sex comprehensive secondary day school for boys only, located in Balgowlah, a suburb on the Northern Beaches of Sydney, New South Wales, Australia. 

Established in 1954 as Balgowlah Boys High School, the campus enrolled approximately 900 students in 2018, from Year 7 to Year 12, of whom one percent identified as Indigenous Australians and 28 percent were from a language background other than English. The school is operated by the NSW Department of Education in accordance with a curriculum developed by the New South Wales Education Standards Authority; the principal is Paul Sheather.

Overview

Balgowlah Boys Campus is a part of the Northern Beaches Secondary College, a five-campus college across Sydney's Northern Beaches, formed in 2003. The school was previously a High School.

The school has engineered significant cultural change in the past few years under the stewardship of Dean White and Paul Sheather. Once known as a bastion of Northern Beaches sporting success, and rarely acknowledged for its academic prowess, Balgowlah Boys Secondary Campus has emerged as an academic leader in NSW in recent years, leading the state in 'value added' literacy improvement in NAPLAN testing 2009, and maintaining this development through to the HSC.

In 2011, Balgowlah Boys Secondary Campus achieved its best-ever HSC results, continuing a surge through state school ranking system that began in 2010. Students achieved significant success across all subject areas, particularly in English, Visual Arts, Mathematics, Industrial Technology and Ancient History. Notably, Balgowlah Boys Campus placed 1st in NSW among comprehensive boys' schools for English. This included Merit List success in consecutive years for Advanced English and English Extension 1.

In the 2012 HSC, Balgowlah Boys campus retained its place as the top comprehensive school in the NSW for English and 41st in the state overall. Remarkably, this placed them well above a number of selective schools, including Penrith, Girraween and Gosford, as well as numerous private institutions.

Analysis of statistical data suggests the recent success of the school is largely due to the innovative, energetic and collaborative pedagogical philosophy of the teaching staff and executive. The increasingly aspirational culture of the school appears to challenge the contumacious adherence to egalitarianism that promotes mediocrity in the government school system, while simultaneously embracing a brand of boys' education which values diverse forms of achievement in both traditional and vocational learning.

Notable alumni 

 Brett Clementsjournalist, presenter, director, producer
 Wayne Jarrattactor on stage and television
 Callan Mulveyactor on television and film
 Iain MurrayAmerica's Cup sailor; designer of modern 18 ft skiff; CEO of Americas Cup Race Management
 David Oldfieldpolitician, co-founded and was deputy leader of One Nation
 Wycliff Paluprofessional rugby union player for NSW Waratahs and Wallabies
 George Smithformer professional rugby union player
 Jack Vidgensinger
 Lalakai Foketiprofessional rugby union player for NSW Waratahs and Wallabies

See also

 List of government schools in New South Wales
 Education in Australia

References

Boys' schools in New South Wales
Educational institutions established in 1954
Balgowlah, New South Wales
Public high schools in Sydney
1954 establishments in Australia